Padam Giri is a Nepali communist politician and a member of the House of Representatives of the federal parliament of Nepal. Giri served as the Minister of Health and Population from 17 January 2023 to 27 February 2023. He was elected from Parbat District representing CPN UML under the first-past-the-post system in the 2017 legislative election. He defeated his nearest rival, Arjun Prasad Joshi of Nepali Congress, by acquiring 39,275 votes to Joshi's 26,819.

References

Living people
Place of birth missing (living people)
21st-century Nepalese people
People from Parbat District
Nepal Communist Party (NCP) politicians
Communist Party of Nepal (Unified Marxist–Leninist) politicians
21st-century Nepalese politicians
Nepal MPs 2017–2022
1977 births
Nepal MPs 2022–present
Health ministers of Nepal